was a Japanese photographer.

After studying at Waseda University, Takagi joined Ōkura-gumi and in 1907 went to New York to head the company's office there. While in New York, he met Shinzō Fukuhara, and became interested in photography.

Among Takagi's work are some autochromes.

Notes

References
Nihon shashinka jiten / 328 Outstanding Japanese Photographers. Kyoto: Tankōsha, 2000. . 

Japanese photographers
Artists from Mie Prefecture
1883 births
1957 deaths